William H. Casselman (July 26, 1868 – July 2, 1941) was an Ontario farmer and political figure. He represented Dundas as a United Farmers of Ontario member from 1919 to 1923.

He was born in Chesterville, Ontario, the son of James C. Casselman, and was educated in Chesterville and Morrisburg. In 1897, he married Flora Carlyle. He was defeated in the 1923 general election by Aaron Sweet. From 1931 until his death, he served as Reeve of the Village of Chesterville. He died in an accident on the farm while unloading hay.

His half-brother Orren D. Casselman served in the House of Commons.

References 
 Canadian Parliamentarian Guide, 1919

External links 

Stormont, Dundas and Glengarry : a history, 1784-1945, JG Harkness (1946)

1868 births
1941 deaths
Accidental deaths in Ontario
Farming accident deaths
United Farmers of Ontario MLAs